Max Näther (1899–1919) was a German First World War fighter ace credited with 26 confirmed aerial victories. Between 16 May and 29 October 1918, he shot down 16 enemy airplanes, including 11 first-rate fighters—ten SPAD S.XIIIs and a Sopwith Dolphin. He also destroyed ten observation balloons; they were crucial artillery observation and direction posts. As such, they were so heavily defended that attacks on them were considered near-suicidal. In addition to carefully calibrated antiaircraft guns defending these posts, a fighter patrol usually lurked nearby to pounce on intruders.

The victory list

The victories of Max Näther are reported in chronological order, which is not necessarily the order or dates the victories were confirmed by headquarters.

Abbreviations were expanded by the editor creating this list.

Endnotes

References

Aerial victories of Näther, Max
Näther, Max